Wind River Pass elevation  is a mountain pass in Larimer County, Colorado near the Twin Sisters Peaks.

See also
Colorado mountain passes

References

Mountain passes of Colorado
Landforms of Larimer County, Colorado